Hieris is a genus of flowering plants belonging to the family Bignoniaceae.

Its native range is Malaysian Peninsula.

Species:
 Hieris curtisii (Ridl.) Steenis

References

Bignoniaceae
Bignoniaceae genera